The 2020–21 Danish 2nd Divisions will be divided in two groups of fourteen teams. The top team of each group will be promoted to the 2021–22 Danish 1st Division. This will be the last season with two groups, and after the season the clubs placed 2-6 in each group will qualify for the new Danish tier 3, and teams placed 7-10 in each group will qualify for the new Danish tier 4. The bottom four clubs in each group will be relegated to the Denmark Series.

Participants

Group 1

League table

Group 2

League table

References

3
Danish 2nd Divisions
Danish 2nd Division seasons